Grantz is a surname. Notable people with the surname include:

Gunnar Grantz (1885–1941), Norwegian rower
Jordan Grantz (born 1992), American Samoan footballer

Fictional characters
 Grantz, a fictional character in the light novel series The Saga of Tanya the Evil